Aba Airport  is an airport serving Aba, a city in the Haut-Uélé province of the Democratic Republic of the Congo.

References

External links
OpenStreetMap - Aba Airport
OurAirports - Aba Airport
FallingRain - Aba Airport

Airports in Haut-Uélé